The City of Northglenn is a home rule municipality located in Adams and Weld counties, Colorado, United States. Northglenn is a part of the Denver–Aurora–Lakewood, CO Metropolitan Statistical Area. As of the 2010 census the city's population was 35,789. It was built as a master planned community in 1959 by Jordon Perlmutter.

The city is directly connected to Downtown Denver via the Regional Transportation District N Line at the Northglenn/112th station.

Geography
Northglenn is located at  (39.897418, -104.981891).

Climate

According to the Köppen Climate Classification system, Northglenn has a humid subtropical climate, abbreviated "Cfa" on climate maps.

Demographics

At the 2000 census there were 31,575 people, 11,610 households, and 8,208 families living in the city. The racial makeup of the city was 83.04% White, 1.52% African American, 1.14% Native American, 3.07% Asian, 0.15% Pacific Islander, 8.13% from other races, and 2.94% from two or more races. Hispanic or Latino people of any race were 20.27%.

Of the 11,610 households 33.8% had children under the age of 18 living with them, 53.6% were married couples living together, 11.8% had a female householder with no husband present, and 29.3% were non-families. 23.0% of households were one person and 5.5% were one person aged 65 or older. The average household size was 2.71 and the average family size was 3.19.

The age distribution was 26.7% under the age of 18, 9.9% from 18 to 24, 32.9% from 25 to 44, 20.3% from 45 to 64, and 10.2% 65 or older. The median age was 33 years. For every 100 females, there were 100.1 males. For every 100 females age 18 and over, there were 98.7 males.

The median household income was $48,276 and the median family income  was $52,888. Males had a median income of $36,214 versus $28,231 for females. The per capita income for the city was $20,253. About 3.8% of families and 5.4% of the population were below the poverty line, including 6.3% of those under age 18 and 4.7% of those age 65 or over.

Notable people
Notable individuals who were born in or have lived in Northglenn include:
 Odell Barry (1941-2022), football wide receiver, mayor of Northglenn
 Steve Taylor (1957- ), guitarist, singer-songwriter, producer

See also

Outline of Colorado
Index of Colorado-related articles
State of Colorado
Colorado cities and towns
Colorado municipalities
Colorado counties
Adams County, Colorado
Adams County School District 12
Weld County, Colorado
List of statistical areas in Colorado
Front Range Urban Corridor
North Central Colorado Urban Area
Denver-Aurora-Boulder, CO Combined Statistical Area
Denver-Aurora-Broomfield, CO Metropolitan Statistical Area
Greeley, CO Metropolitan Statistical Area

References

External links
City of Northglenn official website
CDOT map of the Town of Northglenn

Cities in Adams County, Colorado
Cities in Weld County, Colorado
Cities in Colorado
Denver metropolitan area
1969 establishments in Colorado
Populated places established in 1969